Esequiel Omar Barco (born 29 March 1999) is an Argentine professional footballer who plays as an attacking midfielder and winger for Argentine Primera División club River Plate, on loan from Major League Soccer club Atlanta United.

Born in Villa Gobernador Gálvez, Barco began his career with Independiente. He was promoted to the first team and made his debut during the 2016–17 season. Barco played two seasons with Independiente before signing with American side Atlanta United in 2018. At the international level, Barco has represented Argentina at the under-20's.

Club career

Independiente
Born in Villa Gobernador Gálvez, Santa Fe, Barco joined Independiente's youth setup in 2015 from AA Jorge Bernardo Griffa. Promoted to the first team by manager Gabriel Milito in July 2016, he signed his first professional contract later that month.

Barco made his first team – and Primera División – debut on 28 August 2016, coming on as a second-half substitute for Jesús Méndez in a 1–0 away win against Belgrano. He scored his first professional goal on 11 September, netting the last in a 2–0 home defeat of Godoy Cruz.

Barco finished his first senior season with four goals in 30 league appearances. A starter during the 2017 Copa Sudamericana, he scored the equalizer in the second leg of the Final against Flamengo through a penalty kick.

Atlanta United
On 19 January 2018, Barco joined Major League Soccer club Atlanta United as a designated player. The transfer fee paid by Atlanta United was reported to be $15 million, an MLS record. Barco made his debut for Atlanta United on 15 April 2018 in a 2–2 draw against New York City FC, coming on as a 70th minute substitute for Kevin Kratz. He scored his first goal for the club on 5 May 2018 against the Chicago Fire. He scored the opening goal as Atlanta United won 2–1.

Barco was on the bench for Atlanta United during MLS Cup 2018 against the Portland Timbers. He came as a substitute in the first minute of second-half stoppage time as Atlanta United won 2–0. Barco then won his second trophy with Atlanta United when the club won 3–2 over América in the Campeones Cup, coming on as a late second-half substitute. A couple of weeks later, on 27 August, Barco was a starter in the U.S. Open Cup final against Minnesota United, helping his side win 2–1.

Career statistics

Club

Honours 
Independiente
 Copa Sudamericana: 2017

Atlanta United
 MLS Cup: 2018
 U.S. Open Cup: 2019
 Campeones Cup: 2019

Individual
 MLS All-Star: 2018, 2019

References

External links

1999 births
Living people
Sportspeople from Santa Fe Province
Argentine footballers
Association football midfielders
Argentine Primera División players
Major League Soccer players
Club Atlético Independiente footballers
Atlanta United FC players
Argentina youth international footballers
Designated Players (MLS)
Expatriate soccer players in the United States
Argentine expatriate sportspeople in the United States
Olympic footballers of Argentina
Footballers at the 2020 Summer Olympics